Holy Trinity Catholic Church in Shreveport, Louisiana was built in 1896.  It was listed on the National Register of Historic Places in 1984. The current structure is the third church, with the first being constructed in 1856 by Fr. Jean Pierre, who became the first pastor. During the city's Yellow Fever epidemic of 1873, Fr. Jean Pierre and his assistant pastor, Fr. Isidore Quemerais, both gave their lives while caring for the sick and dying.

Interior
 
The Romanesque Revival interior of the church. Note the Communion Rail, as it is one of the last fully present Communion Rails in a Catholic church in the City of Shreveport. The side Altars are not original to the church. The two Gothic Revival side Altars are from a former church in the area. The church was extensively renovated and restored under Monsignor O'Hanlon starting in the 1970s.

See also
Cathedral of St. John Berchmans
National Register of Historic Places listings in Caddo Parish, Louisiana

References 

Churches on the National Register of Historic Places in Louisiana
Roman Catholic churches completed in 1896
19th-century Roman Catholic church buildings in the United States
Churches in Shreveport, Louisiana
National Register of Historic Places in Caddo Parish, Louisiana
Individually listed contributing properties to historic districts on the National Register in Louisiana
1896 establishments in Louisiana